Elliot railway station is a closed railway station on the North Coast railway line, Queensland.

References

Disused railway stations in Queensland
North Coast railway line, Queensland